The simple station Calle 85 is part of the TransMilenio mass-transit system of Bogotá, Colombia, which opened in 2000.

Location
The station is located in northern Bogotá, on Autopista Norte with Calle 85.

It serves the Polo Club and Antiguo Country neighborhoods, as well as the shopping areas on Carrera 15 and the nearby Zona Rosa.

History
After the opening of the Portal de Usme in early 2001, the Autopista Norte line was opened. This station was added as a northerly expansion of that line, which was completed with the opening of the Portal del Norte later that year.

The station is named Calle 85 due to its proximity to that road.

Station services

Old trunk services

Main line service

Feeder routes
This station does not have connections to feeder routes.

Inter-city service
This station does not have inter-city service.

See also
List of TransMilenio Stations

References

External links
TransMilenio

TransMilenio